Novaya Nadezhda is a rural locality (a settlement) and the administrative center of Novonadezhdinskoye Rural Settlement, Gorodishchensky District, Volgograd Oblast, Russia. The population was 1,570 as of 2010. There are 14 streets.

Geography 
Novaya Nadezhda is located in steppe, 26 km northwest of Gorodishche (the district's administrative centre) by road. Stepnoy is the nearest rural locality.

References 

Rural localities in Gorodishchensky District, Volgograd Oblast